Rás Tailteann ("Tailteann Race"), often shortened to the Rás, is an annual international cycling stage race, held in Ireland. Traditionally held in May, the race returned after a hiatus in 2022 as 5 day event held in June. By naming the race Rás Tailteann the original organisers, members of the National Cycling Association (NCA), were associating the cycle race with the Tailteann Games, a Gaelic festival in early medieval Ireland.

The event was founded by Joe Christle in 1953 and was organised under the rules of the National Cycling Association (NCA). At that time competitive cycling in Ireland was deeply divided between three cycling organisations, the NCA, Cumann Rothaiochta na hÉireann (CRÉ) and the Northern Ireland Cycling Federation (NICF). The Rás Tailteann was the biggest race that the NCA organised each year.

As a result of a Union Cycliste Internationale (UCI) motion, the NCA was banned from international races and all teams affiliated with the UCI were banned from competing in races organised by the NCA. Therefore, only teams that were not affiliated with the UCI or who were willing to take the chance of serving a suspension for competing in the Rás Tailteann competed in the Rás Tailteann. During this time the NCA cyclists achieved prominence in the Rás with Gene Mangan, Sé O'Hanlon and Paddy Flanagan being several legends of the race. Mangan won only one Rás but featured in the race throughout the 1960s and early-1970s winning a total of 12 stages while O'Hanlon won the race four times and won 24 stages. Flanagan won the Rás three times and had 11 stage wins.

The NCA and the CRÉ together with NICF began unification talks in the late 1960s and early 1970s. As a result, a CRÉ team which included Pat McQuaid, Kieron McQuaid, Peter Morton and Peter Doyle was able to enter the race in 1974. Doyle won the race and the McQuaids won two stages each. The first Rás open to the two associations CRÉ and the NICF was in 1979 and enabled Stephen Roche to compete the event as part of the Ireland team. Roche won the event.

The race developed into a much sought after event by professional and amateur teams from many parts of the world.
As part of the elite international calendar it was eligible to award qualifying points that are required for participation in Olympic Games and the UCI Road World Championships.

The first edition was held in 1953 as a two-day event but quickly developed into a week-long event. It ran every year, uninterrupted, until 2018. Following Cumann Rás Tailteann's failure to find a new principal sponsor for the race, it was announced in February 2019 that there would be no Rás that year.

The race was a UCI 2.2 event.

The race returned in 2022.

History

The official name of the race has been changed many times over the years, usually named after sponsors. An Post were the last title sponsors, although this sponsorship ended after the 2017 event.

Race names
1953 to 1967: Rás Tailteann
1968 to 1972: You Are Better Off Saving Rás Tailteann 
1973: Tayto Rás Tailteann
1974 to 1976: Discover Ireland Rás Tailteann
1977 to 1980: The Health Race Rás Tailteann 
1981 to 1982: Tirolia Rás Tailteann
1983: Dairy Rás Tailteann
1984 to 2004: FBD Milk Rás
2005 to 2010: FBD Insurance Rás
2011 to 2017: An Post Rás
2018 to date: Rás Tailteann

Past winners

Bibliography

References

External links

Cycle races in Ireland
Recurring sporting events established in 1953
UCI Europe Tour races
1953 establishments in Ireland
Spring (season) events in the Republic of Ireland